Haan is a 2005 South Korean spy thriller film starring Ahn Jae-mo, Im Yoo-jin and Go Jeong-il. Written and directed by Lee In-soo, it is based on the true story of Korea's first double agent, Haan Kil-soo (also known as Kilsoo Haan), who learned of the Japan's impending attack on Pearl Harbor in 1941, tried to warn the U.S. but was ignored.

Plot

Cast
 Ahn Jae-mo as Han Gil-soo
 Im Yoo-jin as Nanami/Yoon Ji-in
 Go Jeong-il
 Lee Yeong-seok
 Chris Jackson as Reporter

Reception

References

External links 
 
 

2005 films
2000s Korean-language films
South Korean spy thriller films
Films set in Korea under Japanese rule
2000s South Korean films